Kachholi is a village in Gujarat, India and lies near to the banks of the Ambika River. The nearest towns are Gandevi and Amalsad.

It is served by rail from Amalsad and has regular bus services running through connecting it to towns such as Valsad in the South and Navsari in the North. There is a deaf-mute students school in Kaacholi.
Canada's Top 20 Under 20, Vaibhavi Solanki (MD) was born in here in 1994.

References

Villages in Navsari district